Andrew Prendeville (born October 5, 1981) is an American professional automobile racer.

In 2004, Prendeville took second place in the Cooper Tires Formula Ford 2000 national championship. In 2002, at the Valvoline Runoffs, he won the SCCA Formula Continental national championship, sharing the position as SCCA's Rookie of the Year.

Based in Las Vegas, Prendeville raced in the Indy Pro Series for Andersen Racing from the start of the 2007 season until the middle of the 2008 season. Until departing to "pursue other opportunities", Prendeville drove car No. 5, with signage dedicated to Best Friends Animal Society. In 2007, in coordination with the no-kill animal sanctuary, Prendeville launched "Racing Laps for Best Friends", a fundraising initiative that included a website for donation and promotional appearances. In July 2007, Prendeville was named an honorary citizen of Indianapolis in response to his fundraising efforts. He was replaced in car No. 5 by Daniel Herrington. He returned to the series for 2009, driving for Team Moore Racing. He finished a career-best 9th in points with a best finish of third at Chicagoland Speedway.

A resident of Chatham Township, New Jersey, Prendeville, who graduated from Chatham High School in 2000, is the younger brother of Doug Prendeville, who is also a professional driver.

Indy Lights

References

External links
Official Website
Racing Laps for Best Friends official site

1981 births
Chatham High School (New Jersey) alumni
Indy Lights drivers
Indy Pro 2000 Championship drivers
Living people
People from Chatham Township, New Jersey
People from Morristown, New Jersey
Racing drivers from New Jersey
Sportspeople from Morris County, New Jersey
U.S. F2000 National Championship drivers
SCCA National Championship Runoffs winners
Team Moore Racing drivers
Rahal Letterman Lanigan Racing drivers